Chen Chuan-show (born 9 September 1941) is a Taiwanese sprinter. He competed in the men's 100 metres and the decathlon at the 1968 Summer Olympics.

References

1941 births
Living people
Athletes (track and field) at the 1968 Summer Olympics
Taiwanese male sprinters
Taiwanese decathletes
Olympic athletes of Taiwan
Place of birth missing (living people)